Julio Ariza Irigoyen, born in Carcastillo, Navarra, Spain in 1957 is a Spanish entrepreneur who currently chairs the Grupo Intereconomia. He was part of the Spanish People's Party in Catalonia with Alejo Vidal-Quadras and an MP in the regional parliament.

After his political career in Catalonia, he moved to Madrid where he acquired Radio Intereconomía in 1997, a radio formula based on financial information and classical music. In the following years, it became a reference station in Spain.

Currently, the Group comprises several media like television channels (IntereconomíaTV and Business TV), radio (Radio and Radio Inter Intereconomía) and the newspaper La Gaceta, with a strong conservative and anti-abortion ideology.

Nowadays, the chairman of Intereconomía usually comments the news in television programs with high audiences that consolidate him as one of the leaders of communication in Spain.

References 

1950s births
Living people
Spanish businesspeople
Members of the Parliament of Catalonia